Kenneth Robert Wilson, better known by his stage name Ginger Fish, is an American drummer primarily known for playing drums for Marilyn Manson from 1995–2011. Like Marilyn Manson, which combines the names of an iconic beauty with a serial killer, his name combines those of Ginger Rogers and Albert Fish.

He is now the drummer for Rob Zombie after previously joining him on a series of warm up dates in February 2011.

Early life
Ginger Fish was born Kenneth Robert Wilson. He is a graduate of Chaparral High School in Paradise, Nevada.

Music career
Wilson is most notable for being the longtime drummer for Marilyn Manson but has played drums for his own band Martyr Plot, and played piano with Powerman 5000 on their album Tonight the Stars Revolt!. In 2011, Wilson joined Rob Zombie on drums for the February US Warm up tour dates while regular drummer Joey Jordison was in the UK with his own band the Murderdolls. As Rob Zombie said on his website: "Ginger is helping us out with some warm up gigs before we rejoin with Joey Jordison over in England for our next tour."

Since 2010, Wilson has also been doing a number of VJ DJ sets at various clubs around the US.

On February 23, 2011, Wilson announced his departure from Marilyn Manson. On April 22, 2011, Wilson was announced as the permanent drummer for Rob Zombie.

Discography
Marilyn Manson
Smells Like Children (1995)
Antichrist Superstar (1996)
Remix & Repent (1997)
Mechanical Animals (1998)
The Last Tour on Earth (1999)
Holy Wood (In the Shadow of the Valley of Death) (2000)
The Golden Age of Grotesque (2003)
Lest We Forget: The Best Of (2004)
The High End of Low (2009)

Rob Zombie
Venomous Rat Regeneration Vendor (2013)
Spookshow International: Live (2015)
The Electric Warlock Acid Witch Satanic Orgy Celebration Dispenser (2016)
Astro-Creep: 2000 Live (2018)
The Lunar Injection Kool Aid Eclipse Conspiracy (2021)

Filmography 
 Marilyn Manson: Coma White (1999)
 Rob Zombie: Ging Gang Gong De Do Gong De Laga Raga (2015)
 Rob Zombie: The Zombie Horror Picture Show (2014)

References

External links 
 
 
 Ginger's official Instagram page
 

Living people
American heavy metal drummers
Marilyn Manson (band) members
Musicians from Florida
Musicians from Massachusetts
People from Framingham, Massachusetts
20th-century American drummers
American male drummers
Industrial metal musicians
Year of birth missing (living people)